The Special Operations Battalion, commonly known as BOS is the main special forces unit of the Albanian Armed Forces. It is the most elite unit of the Albanian Army. The unit is tasked with special operations in wartime, and primarily with counter-terrorism in peacetime. The BOS members can be recognized by their maroon berets, and the unit insignia which is carried on the right sleeve of their uniforms.

History  
The Special Operations Battalion was created in 1998 as a direct answer to the region's geopolitical situation. Shortly after their creation, teams of BOS operators were deployed along the Albanian-Yugoslav border during the Kosovo War in 1999 and later along the Albanian-Macedonian border during that country's war in 2001. During these two conflicts, BOS' main tasks were reconnaissance and long-range patrol. In 2002, BOS operators were deployed in Afghanistan as part of Operation Enduring Freedom. In Afghanistan, the first contingents operated under Turkish command and their tasks mainly dealt with patrolling the areas around Kabul. In 2004, Albania sent a unit from the Special Operations Battalion to Mosul as part of Operation Iraqi Freedom. The unit together with other units from the Commando Regiment were responsible for base security and perimeter defense. In July 2010, a detachment of 44 men (codenamed EAGLE 1) from the S.O.B led by Colonel Dritan Demiraj was deployed to Kandahar, Afghanistan. Differing from previous Albanian deployments, this detachment was directly involved in combat special operations. The unit worked closely with US military intelligence and was responsible for deep reconnaissance behind Taliban lines, as well as intelligence collection on high-value targets. This is the most decorated unit in AAF.

Recruitment, selection and training 
All members of the Albanian land forces can be considered for special forces training. After applying, the candidates go through a 26-weeks selection process. During the first 12 weeks, the candidates are forced to march cross country against the clock, with increasing distances covered each day, culminating with a 27 km running with full kit in mountainous terrain. This is called the Commando phase. In addition, the candidates have to go through marksmanship, navigation and physical endurance tests. During the last week of the selection process, the tests and marches go on for more than 24 hours without stopping. The candidates that are able to pass the selection process, then go through a 14-week-long training process in which they learn survival skills and master their shooting techniques. After that they undergo 4 weeks special operations and CQB course. For the final test, the candidates are left without food for 72 hours in a remote area of the country; their objective is to evade any possible pursuer and return to base undetected.

Commanders of note
Colonel Dritan Demiraj, Ph. D SOF Commander 2007-2013 (7 Years). He is the most awarded officer in AAF. He is awarded among other medals the Presidential "Medal of Honor" 2014, Presidential "Golden Eagle Medal" 2011. Presidential Medal "Grand Master of Sports" 2018, Medal as "The best military officer of Albanian Armed Forces on 100 Anniversary of Albanian State, November 28, 2012, Minister of Interior of Albania in 2017. He works as Professor of National Security in USA.

References 

Military special forces battalions
 
Special forces of Albania
Military units and formations established in 1998